Beyeria is a genus of rove beetles in the family Staphylinidae. There are at least two described species in Beyeria.

Species
These two species belong to the genus Beyeria:
 Beyeria pax Jacobson, Kistner and Abdel-Galil, 1987 i c g
 Beyeria vespa Fenyes, 1910 i c g b
Data sources: i = ITIS, c = Catalogue of Life, g = GBIF, b = Bugguide.net

References

Further reading

 
 
 
 

Aleocharinae
Articles created by Qbugbot